TeraChem is a computational chemistry software program designed for CUDA-enabled Nvidia GPUs. The initial development started at the University of Illinois at Urbana-Champaign and was subsequently commercialized. It is currently distributed by PetaChem, LLC, located in Silicon Valley. As of 2020, the software package is still under active development.

Core features
TeraChem is capable of fast ab initio molecular dynamics and can utilize density functional theory (DFT) methods for nanoscale biomolecular systems with hundreds of atoms. All the methods used are based on Gaussian orbitals, in order to improve performance on contemporary (2010s) computer hardware.

Press coverage
 Chemical and Engineering News (C&EN) magazine of the American Chemical Society first mentioned the development of TeraChem in Fall 2008.
 Recently, C&EN magazine has a feature article covering molecular modeling on GPU and TeraChem.
 According to the 2010 post at the Nvidia blog, TeraChem has been tested to deliver 8-50 times better performance than General Atomic and Molecular Structure System (GAMESS). In that benchmark, TeraChem was executed on a desktop machine with four (4) Tesla GPUs and GAMESS was running on a cluster of 256 quad core CPUs.
 TeraChem is available for free via GPU Test Drive.

Major release history
2017
 TeraChem version 1.93P
Support for Maxwell and Pascal GPUs (e.g. Titan X-Pascal, P100)
Use of multiple basis sets for different elements $multibasis
Use of polarizable continuum methods for ground and excited states
2016
 TeraChem version 1.9
Support for Maxwell cards (e.g., GTX980, TitanX)
Effective core potentials (and gradients)
Time-dependent density functional theory 
Continuum solvation models (COSMO)
2012
 TeraChem version 1.5
Full support of polarization functions: energy, gradients, ab initio dynamics and range-corrected DFT functionals (CAMB3LYP, wPBE, wB97x)
2011
 TeraChem version 1.5a (pre-release)
Alpha version with the full support of d-functions: energy, gradients, ab initio dynamics
 TeraChem version 1.43b-1.45b
Beta version with polarization functions for energy calculation (HF/DFT levels) as well as other improvements.
 TeraChem version 1.42
This version was first deployed at National Center for Supercomputing Applications' (NCSA) Lincoln supercomputer for National Science Foundation (NSF) TeraGrid users as announced in NCSA press release.
2010
 TeraChem version 1.0
 TeraChem version 1.0b
The very first initial beta release was reportedly downloaded more than 4,000 times.

Publication list
 Charge Transfer and Polarization in Solvated Proteins from Ab Initio Molecular Dynamics
I. S. Ufimtsev, N. Luehr and T. J. Martinez
Journal of Physical Chemistry Letters, Vol. 2, 1789-1793 (2011)
 Excited-State Electronic Structure with Configuration Interaction Singles and Tamm-Dancoff Time-Dependent Density Functional Theory on Graphical Processing Units
C. M. Isborn, N. Luehr, I. S. Ufimtsev and T. J. Martinez
Journal of Chemical Theory and Computation, Vol. 7, 1814-1823 (2011)
 Dynamic Precision for Electron Repulsion Integral Evaluation on Graphical Processing Units (GPUs)
N. Luehr, I. S. Ufimtsev, and T. J. Martinez
Journal of Chemical Theory and Computation, Vol. 7, 949-954 (2011)
 Quantum Chemistry on Graphical Processing Units. 3. Analytical Energy Gradients and First Principles Molecular Dynamics
I. S. Ufimtsev and T. J. Martinez
Journal of Chemical Theory and Computation, Vol. 5, 2619-2628 (2009)
 Quantum Chemistry on Graphical Processing Units. 2. Direct Self-Consistent Field Implementation
I. S. Ufimtsev and T. J. Martinez
Journal of Chemical Theory and Computation, Vol. 5, 1004-1015 (2009)
 Quantum Chemistry on Graphical Processing Units. 1. Strategies for Two-Electron Integral Evaluation
I. S. Ufimtsev and T. J. Martinez
Journal of Chemical Theory and Computation, Vol. 4, 222-231 (2008)
 Graphical Processing Units for Quantum Chemistry
I. S. Ufimtsev and T. J. Martinez
Computing in Science and Engineering, Vol. 10, 26-34 (2008)
 Preparation and characterization of stable aqueous higher-order fullerenes
Nirupam Aich, Joseph R V Flora and Navid B Saleh
Nanotechnology, Vol. 23, 055705 (2012)
 Filled Pentagons and Electron Counting Rule for Boron Fullerenes
Kregg D. Quarles, Cherno B. Kah, Rosi N. Gunasinghe, Ryza N. Musin, and Xiao-Qian Wang
Journal of Chemical Theory Computation, Vol. 7, 2017–2020 (2011)
 Sensitivity Analysis of Cluster Models for Calculating Adsorption Energies for Organic Molecules on Mineral Surfaces
M. P. Andersson and S. L. S. Stipp
Journal of Physical Chemistry C, Vol. 115, 10044–10055 (2011)
 Dispersion corrections in the boron buckyball and nanotubes
Rosi N. Gunasinghe, Cherno B. Kah, Kregg D. Quarles, and Xiao-Qian Wang
Applied Physics Letters 98, 261906 (2011)
 Structural and electronic stability of a volleyball-shaped B80 fullerene
Xiao-Qian Wang
Physical Review B 82, 153409 (2010)
 Ab Initio Molecular Dynamics Simulations of Ketocyanine Dyes in Organic Solvents
Andrzej Eilmes
Lecture Notes in Computer Science, 7136/2012, 276-284 (2012)
 State Equation of a Model Methane Clathrate Cage	
Ruben Santamaria, Juan-Antonio Mondragon-Sanchez and Xim Bokhimi	
J. Phys. Chem. A, ASAP (2012)

See also 
 Quantum chemistry computer programs
 Molecular design software
 Molecule editor
 Comparison of software for molecular mechanics modeling
 List of software for Monte Carlo molecular modeling

References

Molecular modelling
Computational chemistry
Computational chemistry software
Electronic structure methods